The Government of National Unity (October 1944 – May 1945) was a Nazi-backed puppet government of Hungary, which ruled the German-occupied Kingdom of Hungary during the Second World War in eastern Europe. After the joint coup d’état with which the Nazis and the Arrow Cross Party overthrew the government of the Regent of Hungary, Miklós Horthy (r. 1920–1944), the Arrow Cross Party established the coalition Government of National Unity (Nemzeti Összefogás Kormánya) on 16 October 1944.

As the national government, the Arrow Cross Party installed Ferenc Szálasi as the prime minister of the Government of National Unity and as the Leader of the Nation, the head of state of Hungary. As a wartime ally of Nazi Germany, Prime Minister Szálasi's government readily executed and realised the Holocaust in Hungary (1941–1945); thus, in seven months, the Arrow Cross regime killed between 10,000 and 15,000 Hungarian Jews in the country, and deported 80,000 Jewish women, children, and old people for killing at the Auschwitz concentration camp.

Background History 

Late in the Second World War, at the time of the joint coup d’état by which the German Nazis and the Arrow Cross Party overthrew the Regent of Hungary, Miklós Horthy (r. 1920–1944), the Red Army occupied most of the Kingdom of Hungary, which effectively limited the authority of the Government of National Unity to the city of Budapest and its environs as the Hungarian capital city. Despite the Red Army's strategic limitation of Hungarian forces, as agreed with the Nazis, the Arrow Cross regime realised the Holocaust in Hungary with Prime Minister Ferenc Szálasi's resumption of the Nazis’ scheduled deportations of Hungarian Jews, especially the Jews of Budapest; in 1941, 800,000 Jews resided in the expanded borders of the Kingdom of Hungary; in 1945, only 200,000 Hungarian Jews had survived the Holocaust; moreover, PM Szálasi's deportation order also included the Romani genocide (porjamos) of 28,000 Hungarian Roma people.

Prime Minister Szálasi established the "Corporate order of the Working nation" (Dolgozó Nemzet Hivatás Rendje) as the national economy for Hungary. Even as Hungary was in chaos, Szálasi refused theoretically to compromise Hungarian sovereignty, trying to retain nominal command of all Hungarian military units, including the local SS units. Ethnic Germans were still not allowed to join the Arrow Cross Party. Szálasi devoted much time to his political writings and to trips in the shrinking territory under his control: many political matters were effectively handled by his Deputy Prime Minister Jenő Szöllősi. At the beginning of December, Szálasi and his government relocated out of Budapest as Soviet troops advanced towards the capital.  In a scorched earth strategy, the German armed forces destroyed Hungarian infrastructure as the Soviets closed in.

In December 1944, the Battle of Budapest began. Fascist forces loyal to Szálasi and the badly damaged remnants of the Hungarian First Army fought alongside German forces. They fought against the Red Army to no avail. By 13 February 1945, all of Budapest was under Soviet control.

In March 1945, during Operation Spring Awakening (Unternehmen Frühlingserwachen), Fascist Hungarian forces of the Hungarian Third Army fought alongside German forces in the last major offensive in Hungary against the Soviet forces.  For ten days the Axis forces made costly gains. However, within twenty-four hours, the Soviet counterattack was able to drive the Germans and Hungarians back to the positions they held before the offensive began.

Between 16 March and 25 March 1945, the remnants of the Hungarian Third Army were overrun and virtually destroyed. By the end of March and into April, what remained of the Royal Hungarian Army were put on the defensive during the Nagykanizsa–Körmend Offensive and were then forced into Slovakia and Austria as Soviet forces occupied all of Hungary. Béla Miklós's government was nominally in control of the whole country. Nazi Germany itself was on the verge of collapse.

The Ferenc Szálasi regime, which had fled Hungary, was dissolved on 7 May 1945, a day before Germany's surrender. Szálasi was captured by American troops in Mattsee on 6 May and returned to Hungary, where he was tried for crimes against the state and executed, along with three of his ministers. Most of his ministers also were sentenced to death and executed, except four of them. Béla Jurcsek committed suicide at the end of the war, Árpád Henney fled to Austria. Emil Szakváry was sentenced to life imprisonment, while Vilmos Hellebronth was sentenced to death, but the tribunal – before execution – changed his sentence to life imprisonment.

Hungary divided

After Miklós Horthy announced an armistice with the Allies on 15 October, the Germans kidnapped him and threatened to kill his son unless he renounced the armistice and abdicated.  To spare his son's life, Horthy signed a statement announcing both his abdication and the appointment of Arrow Cross leader Ferenc Szálasi as Magyar királyi miniszterelnök (Royal Hungarian Prime Minister) on 16 October. He was then deported to Germany.  This act merely rubber-stamped an Arrow Cross coup, as Szálasi's men had taken over Budapest the previous night.

In his memoirs, Horthy later contended that he never gave power to the Arrow Cross, but had "merely exchanged my signature for my son's life." As he saw it, the appointment of Szálasi was void, since "a signature wrung from a man at machine-gun point can have little legality."

The Hungarian parliament approved the formation of a Council of Regency (Kormányzótanács) of three on 17 October. On 4 November, Szálasi was sworn as Leader of the Nation (nemzetvezető). He formed a government of sixteen ministers, half of which were members of the Arrow Cross Party. While the Horthy regency had come to an end, the Hungarian monarchy was not abolished by the Szálasi regime, as government newspapers kept referring to the country as the Kingdom of Hungary (Magyar Királyság, also abbreviated as m.kir.), although Magyarország (Hungary) was frequently used as an alternative.

Szálasi was an ardent fascist and his "Quisling government" had little other intention or ability but to maintain fascism and to maintain control in Nazi-occupied portions of Hungary as Soviet troops poured into Hungary. He did this in order to reduce the threat to Germany. Szálasi's aim was to create a dictatorial state based on his "Hungarist" ideology.

On 21 December 1944, with the approval of the Soviet Union, Béla Miklós was elected as the prime minister of a "counter" Hungarian government in Soviet-controlled Debrecen. Miklós was a former commander of the Hungarian First Army. He had failed in his efforts to convince many of the men under his command to switch sides. The government that Miklós oversaw was an "interim government" and maintained control in the Soviet-occupied portions of Hungary.

Government

See also 
Hungary during World War II
Operation "Panzerfaust"
Szent László Infantry Division

References 

1944 establishments in Hungary
1945 disestablishments in Hungary
Fascism in Hungary
Hungary in World War II
Politics of Hungary
Germany–Hungary relations